Attwater is a surname. Notable people with the surname include:

Henry Philemon Attwater  (1854–1931), British-Canadian-American naturalist and conservationist
Sam Attwater (born 1986), English actor and singer

See also
Atwater (disambiguation)